The Summit League softball tournament is the conference softball championship of the NCAA Division I's Summit League. The top six finishers in the regular season of the conference's eight teams advance to the modified double-elimination tournament, which in 2022 was at Jackrabbit Softball Stadium. The winner of the tournament receives an automatic berth to the NCAA Division I softball championship.

The league changed its name from the Mid-Continent Conference prior to the 2008 season. North Dakota State has won the most championships with 10. South Dakota State (2) is the most recent champion.

Champions

By year
The following is a list of conference champions and sites listed by year.

By school
The following is a list of conference champions listed by school.

Italics indicate that the program is no longer a member of The Summit League.

References

NCAA softball